João Alberto Rodrigues Capiberibe (born May 6, 1947 in Afuá) is a Brazilian politician. He is Senator, from November 29, 2011 to February 1, 2019.

Capiberibe served as governor, from January 1, 1995 to April 1, 2002. He resigned to passing government's range to vice governor, Dalva Figueiredo, of the PT, to run to the senate.

See also
 List of mayors of Macapá

References 

1947 births
Brazilian Socialist Party politicians
Brazilian Democratic Movement politicians
Living people
Members of the Federal Senate (Brazil)
Governors of Amapá
People from Pará